The 2017–18 Austrian Regionalliga  was the 59th season of the Austrian third-tier football league.

The Regionalliga is split into East, West and Middle (German: Ost, West & Mitte) divisions. The Regionalliga Ost is formed by clubs from the Vienna, Lower Austria and Burgenland Football Associations. The Regionalliga Mitte is made up of clubs from the Upper Austria, Carinthia and Styria Football Associations. The Regionalliga West is made up of clubs from the Salzburg, Tirol and Vorarlberg Football Associations.

Due to the expansion of the Austrian leagues, this season eight clubs were promoted to the 2018–19 Second League, i.e. the successful promotion applicants from each division. A ninth team would have played in a promotion/relegation play-off against the bottom placed team in the First League, but the Austrian FA decided against relegation to the Regionalliga, so there was no play-off.

Regionalliga Ost

Regionalliga Mitte

Regionalliga West

See also
 2017–18 Austrian Football Bundesliga
 2017–18 Austrian Football First League
 2017–18 Austrian Cup

References

External links
 Austrian Regionalliga at fanreport.com 

Austrian Regionalliga seasons
2017–18 in Austrian football
Aus